Parliamentary elections were held in Northern Cyprus on 6 December 1998. The National Unity Party emerged as the largest party in the Assembly of the Republic, winning 24 of the 50 seats.

Electoral system
At the time of the election, Northern Cyprus was divided into five constituencies, electing a total of 50 members of the Assembly by proportional representation. Voters could cast as many votes in their district as there were seats.

Results

References

Northern Cyprus
1998 in Northern Cyprus
Elections in Northern Cyprus
December 1998 events in Europe